A waterphone (also ocean harp) is a type of inharmonic acoustic tuned idiophone consisting of a stainless steel resonator bowl or pan with a cylindrical neck and bronze rods of different lengths and diameters around the rim of the bowl. The resonator may contain a small amount of water giving the waterphone a vibrant ethereal sound that has appeared in movie soundtracks, record albums, and live performances. The instrument was invented, developed and manufactured by American Richard Waters (1935-2013).

The waterphone was available in four sizes: the Standard (7" diameter), the Whaler (12" diameter), the Bass (14" diameter) and the MegaBass (16" diameter). It is generally played in a seated position by a soloist and either bowed or drummed, played as a friction or struck idiophone, with movements to affect the water inside. This combines the resonant characteristics of the bowl and rods in combination with the movement of the water. The sound of the waterphone is often used to evoke mystery and suspense. A superball mallet has become the prime way of drumming the waterphone.

The waterphone is a modern invention influenced by a Tibetan drum—encountered by the inventor in the early sixties—containing a small amount of water affecting its timbre. It is also related to the nail violin, which also used a resonator and rods (nails), and is struck or bowed.

Use

The waterphone has been exhibited in museums and galleries and is the subject of several short documentaries including "Art Notes," aired on public television in San Francisco, and "Celestial Wave," a movie short.  Over recent decades the waterphone has become popular with symphonies, touring bands, and recording studios. Contemporary classical composers who have written parts for waterphone in compositions include Sofia Gubaidulina, Jerry Goldsmith, John Mackey, Christopher Rouse, Colin Matthews, John Woolrich, Carson Cooman, Andi Spicer, Ludovico Einaudi, Andrew Carter, Jörg Widmann, Bernie Krause of Beaver & Krause, and Todd Barton.

The instrument has also been used prominently by rock musicians. Tom Waits is a waterphone collector and player as is Mickey Hart. Other users include Richard Barone (both solo and with The Bongos) and Alex Wong (when playing with Vienna Teng), and it can be heard in music by The Harmonica Pocket. Classical/rock crossover percussionist Tristan Fry of the fusion band Sky used a waterphone on the band's composition 'Meeheeco' (the original version is on 1981's Sky 3, although the instrument can be heard much more prominently on the live version from Sky Five Live).

Canadian musician and composer, Robert Minden, has been composing for his collection of five vintage waterphones on many recordings since the mid-1980s. His ensemble, The Robert Minden Ensemble, formed with daughters Andrea and Dewi Minden and colleagues Carla Hallett and Nancy Walker in 1986, features the waterphone as a central instrument within their 'found object' orchestra.

The waterphone is used to great effect in Howard Goodall's The Dreaming, a musical commissioned by The National Youth Music Theatre of Great Britain, based on Shakespeare's A Midsummer Night's Dream. Goodall uses its ethereal sounds to evoke the mystery of the woods. In Derek Bourgeois' Symphony No 59 - Percussion symphony, which requires 16 percussion players there is a very prominent part for Waterphone.

The waterphone has been featured in the soundtracks to many movies, including Poltergeist, Let the Right One In (2008), The Matrix, Star Trek: The Motion Picture, Dark Water, Crouching Tiger, Hidden Dragon, ALIENS, The Spirit, Female Perversion, as well as TV production 24. Tan Dun's opera The First Emperor (2006) & "Water Music" feature the waterphone. A sound sample can be found at The FreeSound Project. There is a yearly "Waterphone Music Competition" sponsored by Richard Waters. It has also been featured heavily as a sound effect in shows such as Gordon Ramsay's Kitchen Nightmares (though only in the US version).

As the waterphone may be taken into the water, on several occasions the waterphone has been used successfully to call whales and other cetaceans, especially by Jim Nollman of Interspecies Communication. The true story of such interspecies communication was the basis of the stage show and album The Boy Who Wanted To Talk To Whales by The Robert Minden Ensemble in 1989.

Recordings (partial list)
 Richard Waters & Friends - Water Dreams (The Orchard Records, 2000)
 Gravity Adjusters Expansion Band - One (Nocturne Records, 1973)
 Gravity Adjusters Expansion Band - Hole In The Sky (Nocturne Records, 1981)
 John Carter Octet - Dauwhe (Black Saint, 1982)
 Jim Nollman - Playing Music With Animals (Folkways Records, 1982)
 Robert Minden Ensemble - The Boy Who Wanted To Talk To Whales (Otter Bay Recordings, 1989)
 Robert Minden Ensemble - Long Journey Home (Otter Bay Recordings, 1993)
 Robert Minden Ensemble - Whisper In My Ear (Otter Bay Recordings, 1994)
 Robert Minden & Carla Hallett - Are You Now (Otter Bay Recordings, 1999)
 Tan Dun - Water Passion (after Saint Matthew) (Sony Classical, 2002)
 Toshiyuki Hiraoka - Waterfone (Hard Disc Intl, 2015)
 Toshiyuki Hiraoka - Waterphone II (Edgestone Records, 2021)
Sérgio Mendes & Brasil '77 - Primal Roots (A&M Records, 1972)
Cheri Adams - Sweet & Sour Songs (Watermelon Records, 1977)

See also
Daxophone
Glass harmonica
Water organ
Hydraulophone

References

External links

Waterphone Online, site of Richard Waters
AquaSonic Waterphone Online, site of the AquaSonic waterphone
"Ocean Harp", LarkinAM.com.
Waterphone Demo, demonstration of Waterphone made by Brooks Hubbert on YouTube

American inventions
Bowed instruments
Experimental musical instruments
Idiophones